Canach is a small town in the commune of Lenningen, in south-eastern Luxembourg.

Canach lies in the far north of the canton of Remich, and is located approximately 16 km from Luxembourg City. , the town has a population of 1,496. It is the administrative centre of Lenningen commune.

Services
Canach has one bar and is the main depot of the largest bus company in Luxembourg "Emile Weber".

Sports
The town hosts a Luxembourg National Division football club with FC Jeunesse Canach, who play their home games at the Stade Rue de Lenningen.

Canach is home to Luxembourg's largest golf course, the Kikuoka Country Club.

References

External links
Jeunesse Kanesh Football Club
Canach - VisitLuxembourg

Remich (canton)
Towns in Luxembourg